Jane Jebb Mansbridge (born November 19, 1939) is an American political scientist. She is the Charles F. Adams Professor of Political Leadership and Democratic Values in the Kennedy School of Government at Harvard University.

Mansbridge has made contributions to democratic theory, feminist scholarship, and the empirical study of social movements and direct democracy.

In April 2018, Mansbridge was announced to be the 24th laureate of the Johan Skytte Prize in Political Science.

Early life and education
Mansbridge received her B.A. from Wellesley College in 1961, her M.A. in history from Harvard in 1966, and her Ph.D. in government from Harvard in 1971.

Career
Mansbridge previously taught at the University of Chicago and Northwestern University.

Mansbridge is particularly known for the distinction between unitary and adversary democracy (based on common and conflicting interests respectively), and for her concepts of gyroscopic representation (based on inner motivation), the selection model of representation, and surrogate representation (representation of others outside one's district). She is currently working on the necessity for legitimate coercion created by our need for "free use" (or "free access") goods.

Prizes, awards and honors
1971–1972: National Science Foundation Postdoctoral Fellow.
1982–1983: Rockefeller Foundation Humanities Fellow.
1985–1986: Institute for Advanced Study, Member.
 1987: Co-recipient, APSA Kammerer Award.
 1988: Co-recipient, APSA Schuck Award.
1991–1992: Russell Sage Foundation, visiting scholar.
1994: Elected member, American Academy of Arts and Sciences.
1997–1998, 2001–2002: Center for Advanced Study in the Behavioral Sciences, Fellow.
1998: Jane Mansbridge Scholar-Activist Award created, Northwestern University.
 2004: Radcliffe Graduate Society Medal.
2005: Jane Mansbridge Research Paper Award (annual) created, Women and Public Policy Program, Kennedy School, Harvard University.
2004–2005: Radcliffe Institute for Advanced Study, Fellow 2004–2005.
 2010: Midwest Women's Caucus for Political Science Outstanding Professional Achievement Award.
 2011: APSA James Madison Award.
2012–2013: American Political Science Association President.
2014: elected a Corresponding Fellow of the British Academy.
2017: Received a honoris causa doctorate by the French university Sciences Po. The ceremony took place December 12.
2018: Johan Skytte Prize in Political Science
2021: Karl Deutsch Award

Bibliography

Books

Chapters in books

Journal articles 
 
 
 
 
 
  Pdf.
 
 
  PDF version.

References

External links
 Mansbridge discussing democracy at the Kennedy School
 Mansbridge's profile at Harvard
 

1939 births
American political philosophers
Harvard University alumni
Harvard University faculty
Living people
University of Chicago faculty
Wellesley College alumni
Corresponding Fellows of the British Academy